Major-General Sir Francis Howard  (26 March 1848 – 21 March 1930) was a British Army officer in the late nineteenth and early twentieth centuries.

Family
Howard was a younger son of the diplomat Sir Henry Francis Howard (1809–1898) by his second wife Baroness Marie Ernestine von der Schulenburg. Through his father he was a descendant of the Howard Dukes of Norfolk. His brother was another diplomat, Sir Henry Howard (1843–1921).

In 1895 he married Gertrude Jane Boyd, daughter of Hugh Boyd, and they had one son and one daughter.

Military career
Howard was commissioned into the Rifle Brigade in 1866. He took part in the Jowaki Expedition in India in 1877 and then, during the Afghan War, in the Bazaar Valley and Lughman Expeditions of 1878 and 1879, and in operations in Upper Burma between 1887 and 1889.

In 1894 he was appointed commanding officer of the 2nd Battalion the Rifle Brigade, which he commanded in the 1898 Sudanese campaign, including the Battle of Omdurman, and then in Crete.

During the Second Boer War, he was Commander of 8th Brigade and took part in the Defence of Ladysmith in 1900. He later served on the Staff and was placed on half-pay 26 December 1900.

He was made Inspector General of Auxiliary Forces and Recruiting at the War Office in 1903 and then Commander of North Western District in 1904. He was appointed General Officer Commanding-in-Chief at Western Command in 1905 and retired in 1907. He was recalled as Inspector of Infantry during World War I. On 9 December 1919, Howard was appointed a deputy lieutenant of Gloucestershire.

Howard held a number of honorary military appointments, including aide-de-camp to the Queen (1895); Colonel of the Gloucestershire Regiment (1912–13) and Colonel-Commandant of the 2nd Battalion Rifle Brigade (until June 1921).

In 1924 Howard published his memoirs, entitled Reminiscences, 1848–1890.

Decorations
 Commander of the Order of the Star of Romania 1892
 Companion of the Order of the Bath (CB) 22 June 1897, Queen Victoria's Diamond Jubilee honours
 Companion of the Order of St Michael and St George (CMG) 1899, after service in Crete
 Knight Commander of the Order of the Bath (KCB) 29 November 1900, in recognition of services in connection with the Campaign in South Africa 1899–1900
 Commander of the Order of Saint Michael (Bavaria) 1902
 Knight Commander of the Order of St Michael and St George (KCMG) 1917

References

1848 births
1930 deaths
Francis
Knights Commander of the Order of the Bath
Knights Commander of the Order of St Michael and St George
Commanders of the Order of the Star of Romania
British Army major generals
Rifle Brigade officers
British Army personnel of the Mahdist War
British Army personnel of the Second Boer War
British military personnel of the 1898 Occupation of Crete
Deputy Lieutenants of Gloucestershire